Glycine latifolia is a species of flowering plant in the family Fabaceae, native to Queensland and New South Wales in Australia. A perennial, it is a crop wild relative of soybean (Glycine max), and shows resistance to a number of pathogens that afflict soybeans.

References

latifolia
Forages
Endemic flora of Australia
Flora of Queensland
Flora of New South Wales
Plants described in 1980
Fabales of Australia